Shaikh Khalifa Bin Zayed Al-Nahyan Medical and Dental College (

, shortened as Shaikh Zayed Medical College and abbreviated as SKZMDC) is a public college of medicine and dentistry located in New Muslim Town, Lahore, Punjab, Pakistan. It is established on the initiative of CM Shehbaz Sharif to give quality education in the region Punjab and especially in Lahore City.Shaikh Zayed Hospital is attached to the college as a teaching hospital. The college started off in 2009 and the first batch graduated at the end of 2014. The college is on 4th position in ranking of public medical colleges of Punjab. The institute is currently headed by Mateen Izhar.

Departments 

 Basic science departments
 Anatomy
 Biochemistry
 Community medicine
 Forensic medicine
 Pathology
 Pharmacology
 Physiology
 Medicine and allied departments
 Cardiology
 Dermatology
 Endocrinology & Metabolism
 General medicine
 Neurology
 Pediatrics
 Preventive medicine
 Psychiatry
 Pulmonology (Chest medicine)
 Radiotherapy
 Urology
 Surgery and allied departments
 Anesthesiology
 Cardiac surgery
 General surgery
 Neurosurgery
 Obstetrics and gynaecology
 Ophthalmology
 Oral and maxillofacial surgery
 Orthopedics
 Otorhinolaryngology
 Pediatric surgery
 Radiology
 Administrative departments

Affiliated Hospital
It was commissioned on 8 September 1986,

Shaikh Zayed Hospital, Lahore (Urdu: شیخ زید ہسپتال لاہور)
The hospital had 360 beds at the time of commissioning. In 2004, there were 713. Today, there are 1030. All the departments are recognized by the College of Physicians and Surgeons of Pakistan for FCPS training.

The Hospital now attached with

Shaikh Khalifa bin Zayed Al Nahyan Medical & Dental College (SKZMDC).

Admissions

Medical & Dental College
Admission to all public medical & dental colleges is through a centralized system at the provincial level. Students are eligible to apply for MBBS or BDS programs after Higher Secondary School Certificate (HSSC) or equivalent examination. Candidates are selected by a admission process that includes a competitive Medical & Dental College Admission Test (MDCAT) conducted annually under the instructions of Pakistan Medical Commission and more often test is conducted by University of Health Sciences. Only the students who stand higher in merit are selected by this procedure.Merit is determined by the marks obtained on the MDCAT & Higher Secondary School Certificate (HSSC) or equivalent examination.

Foreign/International students can apply for admission through the Higher Education Commission of Pakistan.Most foreign graduated students prefer SKZMDC.

Sheikha Fatima Institute of Nursing
Students can apply for 4 year BSN program after HSSC or equivalent examination. There is no central admission policy for nursing colleges. Students apply directly to college of nursing for admission consideration.

Seat Allocation

Total seats=100

Affiliation
Shaikh Khalifa Bin Zayed Al-Nahyan Medical and Dental College is affiliated with 
Shaheed Zulfiqar Ali Bhutto Medical University which is the admitting University of this college
University of Health Sciences is the degree awarding and examining university.

University of Health Sciences
University of Health Sciences is located in Shaikh Zayed Medical Complex ...

Shaikh Zayed Medical Complex
Shaikh Zayed Medical Complex consists of 
Shaikh Khalifa Bin Zayed Al-Nahyan Medical and Dental College
Shaikh Zayed Hospital
University of Health Sciences office
College of Physicians and Surgeons of Pakistan office
Shaikha Fatima Institute of Nursing.
Shaikh Zayed Postgraduate Institute

Official College Magazine: PHOENIX
The auditions for the editorial board took place in early 2015. Abdul Shakoor, held the interviews and reviewed the CV(s) of students from all five years of medicine, to select the Core members of the editorial board. In May 2015, the Final Editorial Board was formed and notified.
Syed Hasnain Ali, of 3rd Year Mbbs  was selected as the Editor in Chief and five other members were added to the Board as Sub-Editor Phoenix (Hareem Fatima), and Editors and Subeditors of English (Tayyaba Aslam and Ruqaya Idrees) and Urdu sections (Ali Shayyan and Hawa Qasim).
The Pioneer Board was later joined by representatives from all years to collectively form "House of Phoenix".
On January 27, 2016. Phoenix Magazine's first issue was launched and met with positive reviews from the Doctors and students alike, appreciating the bright outlook, the articles and interviews.
Phoenix was renewed for a second biennial edition (Phoenix 16–17) that came out in July 2017.

Campus
Today Shaikh Zayed Medical Complex has a campus of 55 acres opposite The Punjab University lahore comprising the basic departments, administrative block, library and well-equipped modern lecture theatre complex and cafeteria.

For the purpose of extra- and co-curricular activities, kidney center playground is where cricket, football and hockey matches are played.

References

External links
 

Medical colleges in Punjab, Pakistan
Universities and colleges in Lahore
Dental schools in Pakistan
Pakistan–United Arab Emirates relations